Abbottabad Tehsil is an administrative subdivision (tehsil) of Abbottabad District in Khyber Pakhtunkhwa province of Pakistan.

History
During British rule, the current district of Abbottabad was created as a Tehsil of Hazara District, after the independence of Pakistan it remained a tehsil of Hazara until 1981 when the old Abbottabad Tehsil became a district, containing two tehsils - Abbottabad and Havelian.

Subdivisions

Municipal Committees
 Abbottabad (Headquarters)

Cantonments
 Abbottabad Cantonment
 Murree Gallies Cantonment

Town Councils

Nawan Shehr

Union Councils

Bagan
Bagh
Bagnotar
Bakot
Bal Dheri
Banda Qazi
Bandi Dhundan
Biran Gali
Birot Kalan
Birot Khurd
Boi
Chamhad
Chatri
Dahamtore
Galiat
Gojri Union Council
Dalola
Jarral
Jhangi
Kakol
Kakot
Kassaki Kalan
Kokmang
Kothiala
Lakhala
Malach
Moolia
Mir Pur
Nagaki
Nagri Bala
Namal
Namli Mera
Nawan Shehr Janubi
Nawan Shehr Shumali
Palak
Pattan Kalan
Pawa
Phal Kot
Pind Kargoo Khan
Qasba Abbatabad
Rach Behn
Rialah
Salhad
Seri Shehr Shah
Sheikhul Bandi
Sherwan
Sir Bhanna
Tar Nawai

References

Abbottabad District